Them That Follow is a 2019 American thriller film, written and directed by Britt Poulton and Dan Madison Savage. It stars Olivia Colman, Kaitlyn Dever, Alice Englert, Jim Gaffigan, Walton Goggins, Thomas Mann and Lewis Pullman.

It had its world premiere in Dramatic Competition at the Sundance Film Festival on January 27, 2019. It was released on August 2, 2019, by 1091 Media.

Plot
Mara Childs is a Pentecostal pastor's daughter raised in a remote community in Appalachia. To her father's pleasure, she is being seriously courted by one of his parishioners, Garret. However, unknown to everyone, Mara is pregnant by Augie, who has abandoned the church.

Under pressure from her community and her father, Mara decides to accept Garret's proposal.

Mara's father Lemuel runs a sect that incorporates snake handling into his preaching. After a minor dies while handling snakes, Lemuel is warned that the police are investigating him. He allows Garret to claim the snakes are his and lose his job to protect his congregation.

Before marriage, Mara's virginity is checked by Hope Slaughter, Augie's mother. Hope realizes that not only is Mara not a virgin, she is pregnant, as well. Hope decides to keep Mara's pregnancy a secret from Lemuel and Garret, but informs Augie and urges him to repent.

In an attempt to reunite with Mara, Augie attends church and pretends to have a spiritual awakening. Lemuel then urges him to handle a snake which proceeds to bite him. Augie begs to be allowed to go to a hospital but is denied by Lemuel and his own family. After he attempts to save himself by cutting the poison out of his arm, he and Mara have a moment together. They are found lying together by Garret who warns Mara to never see Augie again.

The following day Augie's condition has worsened. After hearing the news, Mara informs her friend, Dilly, that she is pregnant with Augie's child. Dilly then informs Garret who attempts to rape Mara. He is stopped by Lemuel, but before Lemuel throws him out Garret informs Lemuel of Mara's pregnancy.

To cleanse Mara, Lemuel takes Mara to church and has her handle a snake. At the same time, Augie's parents, aware that he is close to death, decide to perform an amputation at home. Mara survives her encounter with the snake, but despite earning her father's approval she decides to leave him to help Augie who is still sick after the amputation. With his parents’ permission, Mara leaves with Augie to take him to a doctor, promising them that she will always be there for him.

Cast
Olivia Colman as Hope Slaughter
Kaitlyn Dever as Dilly Picket
Alice Englert as Mara Childs
Jim Gaffigan as Zeke Slaughter
Walton Goggins as Lemuel Childs
Thomas Mann as August "Augie" Slaughter
Lewis Pullman as Garret
Connor Daniel Lysholm as Jace

Production
In August 2017, it was announced Olivia Colman, Alice Englert and Thomas Mann had joined the cast of the film, with Britt Poulton and Dan Madison Savage directing from a screenplay they wrote. Gerard Butler, Bradley Gallo and Michael Helfant, Danielle Robinson, will serve as producers on the film, under their Amsia Entertainment and G-Base banners, respectively. In September 2017, Walton Goggins joined the cast of the film. In October 2017, Kaitlyn Dever and Jim Gaffigan joined the cast of the film.

Filming
Principal photography began in October 2017, in Youngstown, Ohio.

Release
It had its world premiere at the Sundance Film Festival on January 27, 2019. Shortly after, 1091 Media and Sony Pictures Worldwide Acquisitions acquired U.S. and international distribution rights to the film, respectively. It was released August 2, 2019.

Critical reception
The website's critics consensus reads, "Them That Follow never quite captures the spiritual fervor of its setting, but the cast's committed performances make for an intermittently satisfying character study." On Metacritic, the film holds a rating of 57 out of 100, based on 23 critics, indicating "mixed or average reviews".

References

External links
 
 
 
 
 

2019 films
2019 thriller films
1091 Media films
American thriller films
Films set in Appalachia
Films shot in Ohio
2010s English-language films
2010s American films